The Great Bank Hoax is a 1978 American comedy film written and directed by Joseph Jacoby. The film stars Richard Basehart, Ned Beatty, Charlene Dallas, Burgess Meredith, Michael Murphy, Paul Sand and Constance Forslund.

Plot
There's intrigue and deception at a small-town bank when it is discovered that an unsuspected employee (Paul Sand) has embezzled $100,000.00 while acting as chief clerk. Fearing the public scandal could lead to the collapse of the bank despite the insurance coverage, bank officers Jack Stutz (Burgess Meredith) and Manny Benchly (Richard Basehart) decide to hide the theft in a seemingly clever plot that will make them even more money. However, when word of the crime gets out, the whole community becomes outraged and gets involved, resulting in plenty of trouble.

Cast 
Richard Basehart as Manny Benchly
Ned Beatty as Julius Taggart
Charlene Dallas as Cathy Bonano
Burgess Meredith as Jack Stutz
Michael Murphy as Reverend Everett Manigma
Paul Sand as Richard Smedley
Constance Forslund as Patricia Allison Potter
Arthur Godfrey as Major William Bryer Ret.
John C. Becher as Alex Kaiser
Guy Le Bow as The Sheriff
John Lefkowitz as Deputy Bert
Bibi Osterwald as Sara Pennyworth
Alek Primrose as Rev. De Verite
Martha Sherrill as Louise Farthington
Roy Tatum as Deputy Jason

Production
The film was financed by Georgia investors and filmed in Madison, Georgia. Warner Bros. picked the film up for US distribution.

It was previously known as Remember Those Poker-Playing Monkeys and Shenanigans.

Release
The film was screened at the 1977 Deauville American Film Festival and the Virgin Islands Film Festival. Its premiere was in Atlanta, Georgia under the title The Great Georgia Bank Hoax.

References

External links 
 

1978 films
1970s crime comedy films
American crime comedy films
American heist films
American satirical films
Films set in Georgia (U.S. state)
Films shot in Georgia (U.S. state)
Films scored by Arthur B. Rubinstein
Warner Bros. films
1978 comedy films
1970s English-language films
1970s American films